Anastrangalia reyi is a species of beetle from family Cerambycidae found in such European countries as Austria, Belarus, Czech Republic, Finland, France, Germany, Italy, Liechtenstein, Norway, Poland, Russia, Slovakia, Sweden, Ukraine, and the Baltic states. The species could also be found in Asian countries such as China, Japan, Kazakhstan, and Mongolia.

Subspecies
Anastrangalia reyi reyi (Heyden, 1889)
Anastrangalia reyi sequensi (Reitter, 1898)

References

Lepturinae
Beetles of Europe
Beetles of Asia
Beetles described in 1889